Making Babies is a 2018 comedy film directed by Josh F. Huber and starring Eliza Coupe, Steve Howey, Ed Begley Jr., Glenne Headly (in her final film appearance), and Bob Stephenson.

Plot
John and Katie have been actively trying to conceive for many years with no luck. They decide to try fertility treatments.

Cast 
 Eliza Coupe as Katie Kelly
 Steve Howey as John Kelly
 Ed Begley Jr. as Dr. Remis
 Glenne Headly as Bird
 Bob Stephenson as Gordon
 Elizabeth Rodriguez as Maria
 Jennifer Lafleur as Danica
 Jon Daly as Caesar
 Laird Macintosh as Officer Powers
 Heidi Gardner as Meg
 Eric Normington as Brad
 Pam Cook as Nurse Virginia
 Ericka Kreutz as Nurse Bartlett
 Juston Street as Kenny
 Joanie Searle as Peyton
 Julie Wittner as Dr. Hope

Reception
The review aggregator website Rotten Tomatoes surveyed  and, categorizing the reviews as positive or negative, assessed two as positive and six as negative for  rating.

References

2018 films
2018 comedy films
American comedy films
2010s English-language films
2010s American films